David McKee Wright (6 August 1869 – 5 February 1928) was an Irish-born poet and journalist, active in New Zealand and Australia.

Early life
Wright was born at Ballynaskeagh, County Down, Ireland, the second son of Rev. William Wright, D.D. (1837-1899), a Congregational missionary working in Damascus, scholar and author, and his wife Ann (d.1877), née McKee, daughter of the Rev. David McKee, an educationist and author. 
David Wright was born while his parents were home on furlough and was left with a grandmother (Rebecca McKee) until he was seven years old. 
Wright was educated at the local Glascar School and then from 1876 in England at Mr Pope's School and the Crystal Palace School of Engineering, London.

New Zealand
Wright migrated to New Zealand in 1887 and spent several years as a rabbiter on stations in Central Otago. During this time he wrote in both prose and verse for major provincial newspapers about station life. He studied for the Congregational ministry and Wright studied divinity from 1896 at the University of Otago.   Wright had done a lot of private reading, but found that apart from English his education was generally below that of the other students. In 1897 Wright was awarded a Stuart prize for poetry. Wright published four volumes of ballads, Aorangi and other Verses (1896), Station Ballads and other Verses (1897), Wisps of Tussock (1900), and New Zealand Chimes (1900). As a clergyman Wright was liked, but he found the work uncongenial and gave it up for journalism in which he had considerable experience in New Zealand. Wright married Elizabeth Couper at Dunedin on 3 August 1899; a son David was born in 1900, but the marriage failed. Wright joined the New Zealand Mail as parliamentary reporter in 1907.

Australia
Wright moved to Sydney in 1910 and did a large amount of successful freelance work for the Sun, The Bulletin, and other papers. Wright was editor of the Red Page of The Bulletin 1916–1926 and encouraged many of the rising writers of the time, and continued to do a large amount of writing himself in both prose and verse. Much of this appeared over pen-names such as "Pat O'Maori" and "Mary McCommonwealth" and much was signed with his initials. As Wright grew older his mind turned more and more to the country of his birth, he published his most important volume, An Irish Heart (1918). In 1920 he was awarded the prize for the best poem in commemoration of the visit of the Prince of Wales, and in the same year the Rupert Brooke memorial prize for a long poem, "Gallipoli". Neither of these poems has been published in book form. From 1912-18 Wright lived with the writer 'Margaret Fane' (Beatrice Florence Osborne, 1887-1962) in Sydney; they had four sons. From 1918 Wright lived with Zora Cross in Greeanawn, Glenbrook, Blue Mountains. He died there on 5 February 1928. The couple had two daughters, Davidina Wright and April McKee Wright (also known as April Hersey), who went on to write at least one wartime thriller.

Legacy
Wright was a friend of Christopher Brennan, Randolph Bedford, Frank Morton and Henry Lawson. Though very much a Bohemian, something of the clergyman still clung to him.  Zora Cross, in An Introduction to the Study of Australian Literature, gave him a high position among Australian poets. Charming though An Irish Heart may be, it is too derivative to be work of the highest kind. It is not a question of individual words or phrases, but rather of a man steeping himself in the modern Irish school of poetry, and with all the skill of his practised craftsmanship reproducing its spirit in another land. A large amount of his work, including some short plays, has never been collected.

References

External links
 Biography at nzetc.org
 Biography at Encyclopedia of New Zealand
 
 
 Poems of David McKee Wright

1869 births
1928 deaths
Australian people of Irish descent
Australian poets
Australian journalists